Maryland Route 365 (MD 365) is a state highway in the U.S. state of Maryland.  Known for most of its length as Public Landing Road, the state highway runs  from U.S. Route 113 Business (US 113 Business) in Snow Hill east to Public Landing Wharf Road at Public Landing.  MD 365 was constructed between 1924 and 1929. A superstreet intersection was built at US 113 in 2015.

Route description

MD 365 begins at an intersection with US 113 Business (Market Street) just east of downtown Snow Hill.  The state highway heads east as two-lane undivided Bay Street.  MD 365 crosses the Snow Hill Line of the Maryland and Delaware Railroad at-grade before leaving the town limits of Snow Hill, where the name of the highway changes to Public Landing Road.  After passing the Worcester County Recreation Center, the state highway intersects US 113 (Worcester Highway) at a superstreet intersection, in which MD 365 traffic must turn right, use U-turn ramps along US 113, and turn right again to continue on MD 365. Following this, the route crosses Pattys Branch.  MD 365 passes through the hamlets of Mount Wesley and Spence before entering Public Landing.  The state highway reaches its eastern terminus at Public Landing Wharf Road adjacent to the shore of Chincoteague Bay.

History
Construction began on MD 365 from Snow Hill in 1924.  The highway was completed to Mount Wesley in 1927 and to Public Landing in 1929. In 2015, a superstreet intersection was constructed at US 113.

Junction list

See also

References

External links

MDRoads: MD 365
Maryland Roads - MD 365

365
Maryland Route 365